Dipankar Talukdar is a Bangladesh Awami League politician and the former State Minister of Chittagong Hill Tracts Affairs. He is a member of Parliament.

Early life 
Talukdar was born on 12 December 1952.

Career 
Dipankar Talukdar was elected to Parliament from Rangamati as a Bangladesh Awami League candidate.

References

Awami League politicians
Living people
State Ministers of Chittagong Hill Tracts Affairs
11th Jatiya Sangsad members
10th Jatiya Sangsad members
1952 births
Bangladeshi Hindus